Yang Qian  (
born 17 June 1996) is a Chinese-Australian table tennis player who has only a right arm. Yang has won six medals - two gold and four silver in three Paralympic Games. At the 2020 Summer Paralympics, she won a gold and silver medal representing Australia.

Yang's left arm was amputated following an accident when she was eight years old. She first played the sport when she was five years old.

Move to Australia
Yang moved to Melbourne, Australia in 2017 or later. She also registered with Table Tennis Australia, and competed in the Australian Open during the 2019 ITTF World Tour (with able-bodied athletes), losing her only singles match 1–4 to France's Audrey Zarif.

In 2020,  Yang represented Australia at the 2020 Tokyo Paralympics where she won the gold medal in the Women's Singles C10 and the silver medal in the Women's Team C9-10 .

At the 2022 Commonwealth Games, she won the gold medal in the Women's singles C6–10.

Recognition
2022 - Member of the Australian Table Table Tennis Team (Class 9-10) that was awarded 2020 Paralympics Australia Team of the Year.
2022 – Medal of the Order of Australia for service to sport as a gold medallist at the Tokyo Paralympic Games 2020

References

External links
 
 

1996 births
Living people
Paralympic table tennis players of China
Paralympic table tennis players of Australia
Chinese female table tennis players
Table tennis players at the 2012 Summer Paralympics
Table tennis players at the 2016 Summer Paralympics
Table tennis players at the 2020 Summer Paralympics
Medalists at the 2012 Summer Paralympics
Medalists at the 2016 Summer Paralympics
Medalists at the 2020 Summer Paralympics
Table tennis players at the 2022 Commonwealth Games
Commonwealth Games gold medallists for Australia
Commonwealth Games medallists in table tennis
People from Qingjian County
Paralympic gold medalists for China
Paralympic silver medalists for China
Paralympic medalists in table tennis
Paralympic gold medalists for Australia
Paralympic silver medalists for Australia
Table tennis players from Shaanxi
Chinese amputees
Chinese emigrants to Australia
Recipients of the Medal of the Order of Australia
Naturalised citizens of Australia
Medallists at the 2022 Commonwealth Games